Robert Irving may refer to:

 Robert Irving (industrialist), 20th- and 21st-century Canadian industrialist
 Robert Irving (conductor) (1913–1991), orchestral conductor, son of Robert Lock Graham Irving
 Bob Irving (rugby league) (1948–1999), rugby league player of the 1960s and 1970s
 Robert Lock Graham Irving (1877–1969), schoolteacher, author and mountaineer
 Robert Irving III (born 1953), American musician
 Robert Grant Irving, American architectural historian
 Bob Irving (sportscaster) (born 1950), Canadian football sportscaster

See also
Robert Irvine (disambiguation)
Robert Irwin (disambiguation)
 Bob Irvin, leader of the Republican Party in Georgia in the United States